The Seacow is an order of aquatic mammals. 

Seacow or Sea Cow may also refer to:
 Sea Cow Island, British Indian Ocean Territory
 Seacow Head Light, Canada
 Seacow Pond, Prince Edward Island, Canada
 Steller's sea cow
 Sea cow path, Magdalen Islands, Canada